Bozan is a town in Alpu district of Eskişehir Province, Turkey.

Bozan may also refer to:

Bozan, Dazkırı, a village in Dazkırı district of Afyonkarahisar Province, Turkey
Bozan, Şuhut, a village in Şuhut district of Afyonkarahisar Province, Turkey
Bozan, Iran, a village in Zhavarud-e Gharbi Rural District, Kalatrazan District, Sanandaj County, Kurdistan Province, Iran
Bozan, Iraq, a village in Ninewa Governorate, Iraq
Bozan, İspir
Gabriel Bozan (born 1993), Romanian kickboxer

Turkish toponyms